The FIL World Luge Natural Track Championships 1990 took place in Gsies, Italy.

Men's singles

Women's singles

Panyutina becomes the first person not from Austria or Italy to medal at the championships.

Men's doubles

Medal table

References
Men's doubles natural track World Champions
Men's singles natural track World Champions
Women's singles natural track World Champions

FIL World Luge Natural Track Championships
1990 in luge
1990 in Italian sport
Luge in Italy